The 1979 Cathay Trust Championships was a men's tennis tournament played on indoor carpet courts in Taipei, Taiwan that was part of the 1979 Colgate-Palmolive Grand Prix. It was the third edition of the tournament and was held from 12 November through 18 November 1979. Fourth-seeded Bob Lutz won the singles title.

Finals

Singles
 Bob Lutz defeated  Pat Du Pré 6–3, 6–4, 2–6, 6–3
 It was Lutz's 1st singles title of the year and the 8th of his career.

Doubles
 John Marks /  Mark Edmondson defeated  Pat Du Pré /  Bob Lutz 6–1, 3–6, 6–4

References

External links
 ITF tournament edition details

Taipei Summit Open